28 State Street is a modern skyscraper in the Government Center neighborhood of Boston, Massachusetts, United States. Built in 1969, it is Boston's 21st-tallest building, standing 500 feet (152 m) tall, and housing 40 floors.  It has been known as the New England Merchants Bank Building and the Bank of New England Building.

The building has a rectangular footprint which is then setback once near the top floor. The tower does not have a crown and in fact has a flattened roof.

It was designed by Emery Roth & Sons and Edward Larrabee Barnes Associates and developed by Cabot, Cabot & Forbes.

Tenants
Alta Communications
One Medical Group
Citizens Bank
Citadel

See also
 List of tallest buildings in Boston

References

External links
 Emporis.com

Skyscraper office buildings in Boston
Office buildings completed in 1970
Edward Larrabee Barnes buildings
Emery Roth buildings